Peter Niehusen (born 15 July 1951) is the only sportsman to have won international medals as both a coxswain and a rower. He won two gold medals and three bronze medals at the European and World Championships and the 1976 Summer Olympics in Montreal.

Niehusen was born in Lübeck, Germany, in 1951. He coxed the eight from Ratzeburg to European gold in 1965, and the first "Deutschland Achter" in 1966 to world gold. He had to leave his coxing seat because he could not maintain his weight at the required 50 kg any longer.

In 1973 he returned to the German eight; this time as a rower. This team came in fifth place at the 1973 European Rowing Championships in Moscow and terminated Niehusen's ambitions for the eight.
From 1974 to 1976 he and his partner Ralph Kubail in the coxless pair joined Hans-Johann Färber (gold Olympics 1972, in the so-called Bulls-Four) in the coxed four with a different fourth men each year. In 1974 it was Peter-Michael Kolbe, who would become famous as a single sculler. In 1975, it was Dieter Knief, and in 1976 it was Siegfried Fricke. This boat won three consecutive bronze medals, only being beaten by East Germany and the Soviet Union.

Niehusen was team captain of the German rowing team.

Niehusen worked in the cigarette industry for almost 20 years as a member of the management board of Reemtsma Cigarettenfabriken. Later on he worked and lived in Henley-on-Thames, UK, for three years. Nowadays Niehusen lives in Hamburg as a consultant in sports marketing.

References

External links
 

1951 births
Living people
Olympic rowers of West Germany
Rowers at the 1976 Summer Olympics
Olympic bronze medalists for West Germany
Olympic medalists in rowing
West German male rowers
World Rowing Championships medalists for West Germany
Medalists at the 1976 Summer Olympics
Coxswains (rowing)
Sportspeople from Lübeck
European Rowing Championships medalists